Colonel Harry Brighton is a fictional character in the film Lawrence of Arabia (1962). He is played by Anthony Quayle.

Film 

Brighton first appears at T. E. Lawrence's funeral. He has the film's first line of dialogue: "He was the most extraordinary man I ever knew."

Brighton is mentioned in early scenes as being the chief British liaison to the Arab Revolt. He first meets Lawrence during the canyon scene (when Lawrence sings "The Man Who Broke the Bank at Monte Carlo" to himself) and then briefs Lawrence on the situation. Brighton seems to take umbrage with Lawrence and his presence there, and advises Lawrence to "keep your mouth shut" once they get into camp. Their conversation is interrupted when Turkish aeroplanes begin bombing the camp of Prince Feisal (Alec Guinness), whom Brighton complains has ignored his request to withdraw to the south. Feisal speaks to Brighton and Lawrence for the first time after the raid, saying that he will agree to Brighton's advice, but wishes to move the wounded to Yenbo.

Brighton is seen in the exodus scene, witnessing the prank played by Farraj (Michel Ray) and Daud (John Dimech) on Corporal Jenkins, Brighton's aide (Norman Rossington). He then engages in a heated strategic discussion with Feisal and Sherif Ali (Omar Sharif), who accuse him and the British of having imperialist designs. Brighton dismisses their pleas for artillery and modern equipment, emphasizing that he feels discipline and training is more important. He clashes with Lawrence in this scene, disagreeing with his idea of the Bedouin engaging in guerrilla warfare and referring to Lawrence at one point as a traitor. Feisal agrees to Brighton's plan to withdraw to Yenbo, and exits the tent.

Brighton reappears at the end of Act I, confronting Lawrence in the Cairo bar after he has seized Aqaba. Though initially sceptical, he becomes proud of Lawrence's achievement and arranges for him to meet with the new commander, General Edmund Allenby (Jack Hawkins). He sits in on Lawrence and Allenby's conference and expresses admiration for Lawrence's achievement: "I think you should recommend a decoration, sir. I don't think it matters what his motives were - it was a brilliant bit of soldiering!"

Brighton is next seen early in Act II, after Lawrence's first successful train raid. He is still attached to the forces of the Arab Revolt (he would be overall commander since he is superior to the now-Major Lawrence), and chastises Sherif Ali and the Arabs over their method of looting and then deserting the army. He drives around in an armoured car and mans a machine gun during the train raids. He openly clashes with Auda ibu Tayi (Anthony Quinn) after Auda deserts following a successful raid:

Auda: You are a fool.
Brighton: Maybe. I am NOT a deserter!
Auda: Give thanks to God, Brighton, that when He made you a fool, He gave you a fool's face!
Brighton: You are an impudent rascal!
Auda: I must go, Aurens, before I soil myself with a fool's blood.

While Lawrence and his ever-shrinking forces continue north towards Deraa, Brighton returns to Cairo and meets with Allenby. He informs Allenby that Lawrence is exaggerating the size of his force, and defends Lawrence and his actions from a sceptical Allenby, who fears Lawrence has "gone native". Brighton briefly appears in the Jerusalem scene, acting a secretary/aide to Allenby, though his only dialogue is to greet Lawrence. It is clear by this time that he genuinely admires Lawrence and his ability.

Brighton next appears at the staff meeting for General Allenby's army in the field, discussing the movements of the Arab army, and is assigned to find and report on them. Brighton meets Allenby a few scenes later, discussing Lawrence's cocky attitude and expressing fear that he might reach Damascus first - unless they are slowed by a large column of retreating Turks.

Brighton is already in Damascus when General Allenby arrives, informing Allenby of the Arab Council's success in taking over the city. Though Brighton feels the Arabs unable to rule the city, Allenby, at the advice of Dryden (Claude Rains), refuses to aid the Arabs. Brighton chastises Allenby, saying that it's a "heavy responsibility" in allowing the Arabs to collapse in chaos. Brighton later appears with Lawrence's departure and the subsequent conference between Allenby, Feisal, and Dryden. He ultimately becomes so disgusted by their cold attitude towards Lawrence that he excuses himself, hoping to meet Lawrence and express his admiration. Unfortunately, Lawrence has already left, and Brighton is left observing the anarchy engulfing Damascus, with tears in his eyes.

Historical basis 

Brighton was created by Robert Bolt as an amalgam of various officers who served with T. E. Lawrence during the war. Historically, there was no equivalent to Brighton at the time that Lawrence joined with Feisal, although there were a handful of lower-ranking French and British officers who served primarily as weapons advisors. The character most historically similar to Brighton was, perhaps, Lt. Colonel Stewart F. Newcombe, who was a close friend of Lawrence, and unlike Brighton was able to gain acceptance by the Arabs. He was captured in 1917 but was able to escape with the help of a Turkish girl, although he never returned to the Arabian theatre. Newcombe would continue his friendship with Lawrence after the war; he was one of the pallbearers at Lawrence's funeral. In Michael Wilson's original script, Brighton was named Colonel Newcombe.

Other notable officers include Captains Boyle and Garland, the latter responsible for the first British/Arab raid on the Hejaz Railway, Alan Dawnay, Allenby's liaison to the Arabs through 1918, and Lt. Col. Charles E. Wilson, who served as official commander of the British attachment over Lawrence in 1917. Wilson had a much more fractious relationship with Lawrence than the above officers; Lawrence initially did everything he could to avoid serving under Wilson's direct command.

Characterisation 

Brighton was considered by director David Lean to be "the only honourable character in the film", while actor Anthony Quayle thought Brighton was an idiot. Robert Bolt interpreted the character as "stand(ing) for the half-admiring, half appalled disturbance raised by Lawrence in minds quite wedded to the admirable and inadequate code of English decency". Whatever intentions Lean, Quayle, and Bolt had regarding the character, both interpretations can be read into the character.

In the early scenes at Feisal's camp, Brighton comes across as a stuffy, conventional British officer. He is disgusted by the somewhat effeminate Lawrence and seems to hold the Arabs in contempt. His insistence on "discipline" show him to be an inflexible regular army man, although in this scene he shows some hint of flexibility by expressing interest in Lawrence's proposed guerrilla strategy.

However, Brighton gradually becomes respectful towards Lawrence, frequently expressing admiration towards him and even defending him to Allenby, Dryden and others. Unlike Lawrence's other superiors, who simply wish to manipulate him, Brighton genuinely admires Lawrence.

It is clear that Brighton does have a strong sense of honour, as evidenced by his disgust with the Arab practice of desertion and his arguments with Ali and Auda. His distaste towards Allenby's "hands-off" approach towards the collapse of the Arab Council, the British betrayal of the Arabs, and the disrespectful and cold treatment of Lawrence by his superiors leads him to storm out of the conference room abruptly.

A similar character appears in Terence Rattigan's Lawrence-themed play Ross, in the form of Colonel Barrington, although Barrington maintains his contempt throughout the whole of the play, feeling Lawrence to be an unfeeling, soulless brute.

References 

Fictional British Army officers
Fictional colonels